Vitaly Mikhailovich Prilukov (25 February 1939 – 11 June 2022) was a Russian military officer and politician.

He was deputy chairman of the KGB from March to August 1991 and served on the Supreme Soviet of Russia from 1990 to 1993.

Prilukov died on 11 June 2022 at the age of 83.

References

1939 births
2022 deaths
Russian military leaders
Soviet lieutenant generals
KGB officers
Russian politicians
Soviet politicians
Members of the Supreme Soviet of Russia
Communist Party of the Soviet Union members
Politicians from Kazan
Military personnel from Kazan